The 75th Massachusetts General Court, consisting of the Massachusetts Senate and the Massachusetts House of Representatives, met in 1854 during the governorship of Emory Washburn. Charles Edward Cook served as president of the Senate and Otis P. Lord served as speaker of the House.

Notable legislation included incorporation of the Massachusetts Emigrant Aid Company and funding for a "project to build a railroad tunnel through Hoosac Mountain that cost state taxpayers more than $10 million and took 21 years to complete."

Senators

 Samuel D. Parker

Representatives

See also
 1854 Massachusetts gubernatorial election
 33rd United States Congress
 List of Massachusetts General Courts

References

External links
 
 

Political history of Massachusetts
Massachusetts legislative sessions
massachusetts
1854 in Massachusetts